The Orlando Juice was one of the eight original franchises that began playing in the Senior Professional Baseball Association in 1989. The team was managed by Gates Brown, while Dyar Miller and Bill Stein served as player-coaches.

In their inaugural season, the Juice finished third in the Northern Division with a 37-35 record, narrowly missing the playoffs. The team had a slow start with Brown at the helm (9-12), but improved in the midseason (28-23) under Miller's management.

Pitcher Pete Falcone anchored the club's pitching staff with a 10-3 record, and Bob Galasso contributed with a 9-2 mark and topped the staff with a 2.67 ERA. The offensive was led by José Cruz, who hit a .306 average with a team-best 10 home runs and 49 runs batted in, while Randy Bass batted .393 and drove in 27 runs. Nevertheless, the Orlando Juice ceased operations at the end of the season.

Notable players 

Randy Bass
Jack Billingham
Larvell Blanks
Ike Blessitt 
Vida Blue
Bruce Bochy
Roy Branch
Steve Busby
Sal Butera
Dave Cash
Doug Corbett
Mark Corey
Mike Cosgrove
José Cruz
Jamie Easterly
Pete Falcone
Bob Galasso
Wayne Granger 
Johnny Grubb
Ken Landreaux
Sixto Lezcano
Bake McBride
Bill Madlock
Jerry Martin
Larry Milbourne
Dyar Miller
Tom Paciorek
Gerry Pirtle
Ken Reitz
Gil Rondon
Bob Shirley
Paul Siebert
Bill Stein
Jackson Todd
Mike Vail
U L Washington

Sources

External links
SPBA baseball cards

Defunct baseball teams in Florida
Senior Professional Baseball Association teams
1989 establishments in Florida
1989 disestablishments in Florida
Baseball teams established in 1989
Baseball teams disestablished in 1989
Sports teams in Orlando, Florida